Bob's Your Uncle was a Canadian alternative rock band formed in Vancouver.  The band consisted of band founder guitarist Jamie Junger, vocalist and guitarist Sook-Yin Lee, bassist Bernie Radelfinger, harmonica player Peter Lizotte and drummer John Rule. Later to be replaced by drummer Karl Cardosa Aka Charles Pinto. The band's music was characterized by Lee's strong voice and lyrics, and with rock, jazz and blues instrumental accompaniment.

History
The band released its first single, "Talk to the Birds", in 1985, and subsequently released their debut self-titled album in 1986. The band's second album, Tale of Two Legs, came out in 1990, and the band toured in Ontario in support.  The band released one more album, Cages, on an independent label.

After Bob's Your Uncle disbanded, Junger founded a follow up band called The Wingnuts,  toured  with several artists, and pursued a solo career.

Sook-Yin Lee went on to become a VJ for MuchMusic, Canada's music video station, and later an on-air personality for CBC Radio, hosting Definitely Not the Opera and acting in films.

Discography

Singles
"Talk to the Birds" (1985)

Albums

References

External links
 Jamie Junger

Musical groups established in 1985
Musical groups disestablished in 1994
Musical groups from Vancouver
Canadian alternative rock groups
1985 establishments in British Columbia
1994 disestablishments in British Columbia